D'Masiv is an Indonesian rock band which based in Jakarta. It consists of six members: Rian Ekky Pradipta (vocals), Dwiki Aditya Marsall (guitar),Nurul Damar Ramadan (guitar), Rayyi Kurniawan Iskandar Dinata (bass), Wahyu Piadji (drums), and Vegry Harindah Husain (keyboardist). D'Masiv' name later aligned with the bands "Top" of Indonesia such as Ungu, Nidji, or Peterpan (now known as Noah) because of the popularity of their songs.

History
D'Masiv was formed on March 3, 2003. D'Masiv's name is derived from the English word "massive" as a hope to be able to achieve the best possible results in the national music scene. Their names began to soar after winning the competition music A Mild Live Wanted in 2007. D'Masiv released their first album titled Perubahan in 2008 with the song "Cinta Ini Membunuhku" as its flagship song. The song was so popular that more and toss their name in the national music scene. At the end of 2008, d'Masiv makes containers for his fans association with the names Masiver.

In November 2009, d'Masiv released the new EP which contains two songs titled "Minta Ampun Aku" and "Jangan Menyerah". According to Rian, vocalist for d'Masiv, making mini-albums released this very brief and to welcome the month Ramadan which falls in mid-August 2009.

Band members
 Rian Ekky Pradipta — vocals (2003–present)
 Dwiki "Kiki" Aditya Marsall — guitar (2003–present)
 Nurul Damar Ramadhan — guitar (2003–present)
 Rayyi Kurniawan Iskandar Dinata — bass guitar (2003–present)
 Wahyu Piadji  — drums (2003–present)
 Vegry Harindah Husain - Keyboardist  (2019–present)

Discography

Studio albums

Compilation albums

Soundtrack album

Live album

Extended plays

Singles

As featured artist

Awards and nominations 

|-
| 2008
| rowspan="7"| D'Masiv
| MTV Indonesia Awards — Most Breakthrought Artist
| 
|-
| rowspan="4"| 2009
| Anugerah Planet Muzik —  Best Duo/Group Newcomer
| 
|-
| Anugerah Planet Muzik —  Favourite Indonesian Artist
| 
|-
| MTV Indonesia Awards — Best Artist Of The Year
| 
|-
| MTV Indonesia Awards — Most Favorite Band/Group/Duo
| 
|-
| rowspan="7"| 2010
| Indonesian Music Awards —  Best Pop Duo/Group
| 
|-
| Dahsyatnya Awards —  Outstanding Band
| 
|-
| rowspan="4"| "Jangan Menyerah"
| Indonesian Music Awards —  Best Pop Song
| 
|-
| Indonesian Music Awards —  Best of the Best Production
| 
|-
| Dahsyatnya Awards —  Outstanding Song
| 
|-
| Dahsyatnya Awards —  Outstanding Video Clip
| 
|-
| Special Edition
| Indonesian Music Awards —  Best Pop Album
| 
|-
| rowspan="3"| 2011
| D'Masiv
| Indonesian Music Awards — Best Pop Duo/Group
| 
|-
| rowspan="2"| Perjalanan
| Indonesian Music Awards — Best Pop Album
| 
|-
| Indonesian Music Awards — Best of the Best Album
| 
|-
| rowspan="1"| 2014
| D'Masiv
| Indonesian Music Awards — Best Pop Duo/Group
| 
|-
| rowspan="1"| 2015
| Rian D'Masiv – "Jadi Matahari"
| Indonesian Music Awards — Best Children Songwriter
| 
|-
| rowspan="3"| 2017
| D'Masiv
| Dahsyatnya Awards — Outstanding Band
| 
|-
| "Satu-Satunya" (featuring Iwan Fals)
| Dahsyatnya Awards — Outstanding Song
| 
|-
| D'Masiv (featuring Iwan Fals)
| Dahsyatnya Awards — Outstanding Duet/Collaboration
| 
|}

Notes 
 The album can also called as Orange Album.

References

External links
 Official site
 D'Masiv  at Musica Studios
 D'Masiv discography on Discogs
 D'Masiv discography on iTunes

Indonesian musical groups
Indonesian pop music groups
Indonesian rock music groups
Musical groups established in 2003
Anugerah Musik Indonesia winners